Joakim Tobias Aspelin (born 29 November 1968 in Lund, Sweden) is a Swedish actor.

Selected filmography
2009 - Beck – I stormens öga
2009 - Wallander – Prästen
2008 - Oskyldigt dömd (TV)
2007 - Den nya människan
2005 - Carambole
2005 - Krama mig
2001 - Familjehemligheter
2000 - Nya tider (TV)
2013 - Fröken Frimans krig (TV)

External links
Tobias Aspelin on Swedish Film Database
Official website

Tobias Aspelin on www.agentbolaget.se

Swedish male actors
Living people
1968 births
21st-century Swedish people